Ivondrovia is a genus of parasitoid wasps belonging to the subfamily Doryctinae of the family Braconidae. This genus contains two species. It is found in the Afrotropical region.

Description
Head high and transverse. Ocelli arranged in slightly obtuse triangle. Frons (forehead) slightly concave. Eyes glabrous. Clypeus slightly convex. No malar suture  Antennae weakly setiform. Mesosoma not depressed. Pterostigma of fore wing rather narrow. Fore femur thick and short. Claws are simple, large, short and strongly curved.

Species
 Ivondrovia grangeri Belokobylskij, Sergey, Zaldivar-Riveron, Alejandro & Castaneda-Osorio, Ruben, 2018 - Kenya
 Ivondrovia seyrigi (Granger, 1949) - Madagascar

References

Braconidae